The brown-chested jungle flycatcher (Cyornis brunneatus) is a species of bird in the Old World flycatcher family Muscicapidae.
It breeds in South China ; its winters in the Malay peninsula.
Its natural habitats are subtropical or tropical moist lowland forests and subtropical or tropical mangrove forests.
It is threatened by habitat loss.

This species was previously placed in the genus Rhinomyias but was moved to Cyornis based on the results of a 2010 molecular phylogenetic study.

References

External links
BirdLife Species Factsheet.

brown-chested jungle flycatcher
Birds of South China
brown-chested jungle flycatcher
Taxonomy articles created by Polbot